"Ride It" is a song recorded by English singer Geri Halliwell for her third studio album, Passion (2005). It was released on 22 November 2004 by Innocent Records as the first single from the album. "Ride It" was commercially successful in Europe; it peaked at number four in the United Kingdom and reached number three on the Spanish and Scottish charts.

Critical reception
"Ride It" received mixed reviews from music critics. Matt Potter from Yahoo! Launch gave the single two out of ten stars, and said "Enter Halliwell, and her latest attempt to present herself as a sexy siren, all attitude and independence. It's not as if it's a bad song, either - think "Life Is A Roller Coaster", crossed with "Sisters Are Doing It for Themselves" but minus a proper chorus - but the steely, tears-at-a-hen-party desperation of Halliwell's delivery makes this the musical equivalent of getting the eighteenth call in one evening from a girl you met once at a party".

Chart performance
Due to the midweek position of number three, "Ride It" was predicted to peak within the top three, but due to competition from Girls Aloud, Destiny's Child, and Lemar, the song debuted and peaked at number four on the UK Singles Chart. "Ride It" was the 143rd-best-selling single of 2004 in the United Kingdom. The song also reached number three on both the Spanish and Scottish charts. In the Commonwealth of Independent States (CIS), the song peaked at number two and remained on the Tophit chart for 39 weeks, 31 of which were in the top 100.

Music video
The accompanying music video for the song was directed by Luca Tommassini and was filmed in Milan in September 2004. In it, Halliwell dresses as a policegirl and spanks a male model with a truncheon before flashing her bra. She also sticks the truncheon between the man's legs. There is also a close-up of lifting her pink dress and shaking her bottom.

TV executives were worried the video would be too sexual for Top of the Pops Saturday viewers, which was watched by six to twelve year olds. The BBC then censored the video, saying: "TOTP Saturday will air Geri's video without a couple of unsuitable shots".

Entertainment executive Simon Cowell criticized the music video on CD:UK, calling the video "rubbish" as well as "one of the worst videos I've ever seen in my life" whilst also stating, "If I was her record label and that video arrived on my desk, I would throw it in the bin". In response to his criticism, Halliwell wrote to Cowell demanding an explanation for his outburst as well as an apology.

Live performances
To promote the single, Halliwell performed the song on Children in Need, Ant & Dec's Saturday Night Takeaway, Top of the Pops, CD:UK, GMTV, Ministry of Mayhem and This Morning.

Track listings
UK and European CD1
 "Ride It" – 3:46
 "It's Raining Men" – 4:18

UK and European CD2, Australian CD single
 "Ride It" – 3:46
 "Ride It"  – 3:45
 "Ride It"  – 6:33
 "Ride It"  – 5:35

UK 12-inch single
A. "Ride It"  – 7:47
B. "Ride It"  – 8:10

Charts

Weekly charts

Year-end chart

Release history

References

Geri Halliwell songs
2004 singles
2004 songs
Innocent Records singles
Song recordings produced by Ian Masterson
Song recordings produced by Quiz & Larossi
Songs written by Andreas Romdhane
Songs written by Geri Halliwell
Songs written by Josef Larossi
Virgin Records singles